The Curiosity Stream (legally CuriosityStream Inc.), also known as the Curiosity Channel, is an American media company and subscription video streaming service that offers documentary programming including films, series, and TV shows. It was launched in 2015 by the founder of the Discovery Channel, John S. Hendricks. As of 2021, it was reported to have approximately 20 million subscribers worldwide across its direct and bundled platforms.

Curiosity Stream produces original documentaries and series including Royals: Keeping the Crown, The History of Home, Miniverse, Stephen Hawking's Favorite Places, David Attenborough's Light on Earth, and Deep Time History; and additionally features content from producers such as the BBC and NHK.

History 
John Hendricks, who founded Discovery in 1982, started Curiosity Stream as a stand-alone OTT media service in March 2015 with his daughter, Elizabeth Hendricks, as Chief Executive Officer. The service expanded distribution to Amazon Channels, and then in 2017, had its first distribution deal with a multichannel video programming distributor (MVPD) when it became available on Comcast's set-top box VOD platform and the MSO's Xfinity Stream app/portal.

In April 2018, Dish Network made Curiosity Stream available on internet-connected Hopper devices and the Dish Anywhere mobile app.

In June 2018, Clint Stinchcomb was appointed president and CEO of the company, after first joining Curiosity Stream in 2017 as Chief Distribution Officer. He is also the co-founder and former CEO of Poker Central. Previously Stinchcomb held positions as managing director of Worldwide Media Group (WMG) and executive VP and GM of Discovery Communications' Emerging Television Networks.

In July 2020, it signed a partnership deal with Swedish telecommunications company Com Hem to bring the company's library content to Sweden. Many of the programs were made available with Swedish subtitles.

In August 2020, Matthew Blank joined Curiosity Stream's board of directors. Blank formerly served as an advisor to Showtime Networks where he spent over 20 years as the chairman and CEO of Showtime Networks, overseeing series such as Homeland, Dexter, and Billions.

On October 15, 2020, Curiosity Stream became the first publicly traded streaming media company focused on factual content when it started trading on NASDAQ under the Ticker symbol "CURI". The public trading was a result of a reverse merger with Software Acquisition Group, Inc., a special-purpose acquisition company.

In November 2020, Indian pay-TV and OTT provider Tata Sky partnered with the company to bring its content to Tata Sky's subscribers via binge+. The programs were also made available to Tata Sky DTH customers as a linear channel.

In May 2021, the company acquired One Day University, an adult education platform that features lectures from university and college professors. In July 2021, Curiosity Stream partnered with German TV channel Spiegel TV to offer a linear channel in Germany, Austria and Switzerland.

In August 2021, the company announced a rebranding including the shortened name for its parent company, Curiosity, which is composed of Curiosity Stream (streaming service), Curiosity Channel (linear channels), and Curiosity Studios (originals production). The streaming service was also retitled from CuriosityStream to Curiosity Stream.

They have had a long-standing promotion with Nebula to promote a bundle subscription for both services, which has led to a substantial growth of parts of both services, and it was announced in September 2021 that Curiosity bought a minority share of Nebula, valuing the company at over $50 million.

As of July 2022, the service costs $19.99 a year of the HD plan.

Programs 
The service offers on-demand content and linear, live TV-style streams from its VoD catalog. Programs cover factual content including science, history, mathematics, technology, robotics, and nature. It also offers content for children and original programming, along with a Kids Mode option to filter out inappropriate content.

In June 2020, Curiosity Stream signed a partnership with wildlife production company Doclights to add 50 original nature documentaries to SVOD and pay-TV platforms. Programs include Cheetah: Beating the Odds; Hidden Australia; These Birds Were Made for Walking; Jaguar: King of the Jungle; Magical Fjords; Meet the Meerkats; Meet the Marsupials; Puma: The Ghost Cat; and, Sloth Bear: Birth of A Prince.

In November 2020, the company announced a new series, Beyond the Spotlight, from executive producers Leonardo DiCaprio and Stephen David. Each episode features conversations with  celebrity icons, focused on their personal lives, histories, and inspirations. Celebrities include Samuel L. Jackson and his wife LaTanya Richardson Jackson, Kristen Bell, Shaquille O'Neal, Joe Namath, and MrBeast. The first episodes premiered on November 19, 2020.

In December 2020, the company announced an original series focusing on primatologist Jane Goodall called Rescued Chimpanzees of the Congo with Jane Goodall. The series was produced by Curiosity Stream, Off the Fence Productions, and the Jane Goodall Institute and premiered on July 14, 2021. It includes three decades of unseen archival footage.

On June 10, 2021, “Doug to the Rescue,” a six-part docuseries, premiered. The series follows Doug Thron, an aerial cinematographer, who uses technology like drones, infrared cameras, spotlights, and high intensity zoom lenses to find and rescue animals in the wake of natural disasters around the world.

In September 2021, the company released its first original feature-length film, Heval, which is about the life of Michael Enright who volunteered to fight ISIL.

Additional available programs on Curiosity Stream include David Attenborough's Light on Earth and Ant Mountain; Dream the Future, Empire of Tsars, Out of the Cradle; The Spying Game: Tales from the Cold War; The Normans; Heston's Dinner in Space; and The Secret World of Lego. Content for children includes Quarx, Prehistoric Worlds, and Ocean Mysteries with Jeff Corwin.

Documentaries

Viewership and partners 
In August 2021, the company had approximately 20 million subscribers across 175 countries. In 2019, Curiosity Stream was translating its programs into Russian, Serbian, Spanish, Portuguese, Mandarin, and Cantonese.

Curiosity Stream offers annual and month-to-month subscriptions and a 4K plan. It distributes its programming in the U.S. and internationally using a mix of OTT players, pay-TV operators, and broadband ISPs. The app is available through Roku, Apple TV Channels and Apple TV, Android TV, Xbox One, Xbox Series X/S, Amazon Fire TV, Sprint, Google Chromecast, iOS and Android, Amazon Prime Video Channels, YouTube TV, Sling TV, Comcast Xfinity on Demand, LG TV webOS, and PlayStation 4. All programs are available in either HD or 4K.

The service has over 50 partners, including Amazon, Comcast, Altice USA and Suddenlink (USA); Com Hem (Sweden); StarHub (Singapore); Totalplay (Mexico); Multichoice's DStv (Africa); Millicom (Latin America); Okko (Russia); Gazprom-Media (Russia); Liberty Global/FLOW (the Caribbean); and Tata Sky (India).

Awards and nominations 
News & Documentary Emmy Award
 Secrets of the Solar System - Outstanding Science and Technology Documentary (Nominee, 2021)
Stephen Hawking's Favorite Places - Outstanding Graphic Design & Art Direction (Winner, 2017)
 David Attenborough's Light on Earth - Outstanding Nature Documentary (Nominee, 2017)
 David Attenborough's Light on Earth - Outstanding Cinematography: Documentary (Nominee, 2017)

Jackson Hole Wildlife Film Festival
 David Attenborough's Light on Earth - Best Host/Presenter-Led Film (Winner, 2017)
 David Attenborough's Light on Earth - Best Science in Nature Film (Nominee, 2017)
 Big World in a Small Garden - Best Short Film (Nominee, 2017)

Webby Award
 Curiosity Stream - Best Science & Education Channel (Honoree, 2017)
 Deep Time History - Best Documentary Series (Honoree, 2017)
 Science Breakthroughs: Gravitational Waves - Science & Education for Film & Video (Nominee, 2017)
 Curiosity Stream - Best Science & Education Channel (Honoree, 2016)

British Academy Film Awards (BAFTA)
 David Attenboroughs Light on Earth - Specialist Factual (Nominee, 2017)

See also 
 Curiosity (website)

References

External links 
 

2015 establishments in Maryland
2020 initial public offerings
American companies established in 2015
Companies based in Silver Spring, Maryland
Companies listed on the Nasdaq
Documentary film production companies
Film production companies of the United States
Internet properties established in 2015
Mass media companies established in 2015
Special-purpose acquisition companies
Streaming television in the United States
Subscription video on demand services